is the name given to a dojo built in November 1931 in Shizuoka, Japan.

The Dojo
The brother and friends of Master Minoru Mochizuki built this dojo for him while he was recovering from pleurisy and pulmonary tuberculosis. When the dojo was built, a friend of the Mochizuki family (a philosophy teacher) called it Yōseikan. Mochizuki immediately adopted the name since it means "the place to cultivate truth/righteousness". It reflected his teacher's ideals and it reinforced the positive attitude of "Mutual welfare and prosperity" he had always promoted. The official opening of the dojo was held in November 1931 and many dignitaries from Tokyo, including Morihei Ueshiba, Admiral Isamu Takeshita, and General Makoto Miura attended. It had to be rebuilt after World War II during which it was burnt down.

The Yōseikan served as the centre for many martial arts
in Shizuoka until the 1970s. The martial arts taught at the dojo included Aikido, Judo, Karate, and Tenshin Shoden Katori Shinto Ryu. In the 1970s it became the home to Mochizuki's composite martial art, Yoseikan Budo. The Yōseikan building is currently home to the International Budo Seifukai Federation.

The Yōseikan dojo is located at Mukoshikiji 846, Shizuoka-shi, Japan.

See also
Yoseikan Budo
Yoseikan Aikido
Yoseikan Karate

References

External links
Yoseikan Hombu Dojo
Yoseikan World Federation
Yoseikan Budo Iran
International Yoseikan Budo Federation (Yoseikan Aikido)
Seifukai, formerly Yoseikan Dojo in Shizuoka, Japan

Dōjō